Jean-Pierre Marois is a French film director and producer. He is most noted for directing the film American Virgin (1999) and as co-producer of the film Mary (2005).

Filmography 
 Save the Rabbits (1994) (co-producer)
 American Virgin (1999) (director & executive producer)
 Mary (2005) (co-producer)
 South of the Border (2009) (associate producer)
 I Come with the Rain (2009) (executive producer)
 Pericle il Nero (2011) (co-producer)

External links

French film directors
French film producers
Living people
Year of birth missing (living people)